The 2017 United Kingdom general election in Northern Ireland was held on 8 June 2017. All 18 seats in Northern Ireland were contested. 1,242,698 people were eligible to vote, up 5,933 from the 2015 general election. 65.6% of eligible voters turned out, an increase of 7.2 percentage points from the last general election.

The DUP gained 2 seats for a total of 10, and Sinn Féin won 7, an improvement of 3. Independent unionist Sylvia Hermon was also re-elected in her constituency of North Down. Meanwhile, the SDLP lost 3 seats and the UUP lost 2 seats, meaning they both lost all their representation in the House of Commons.

As Sinn Féin maintains a policy of abstentionism in regards to the British Parliament, the 2017 election marked the first parliament since 1964 without any Irish nationalist MPs who take their seats in the House of Commons in Westminster.

Nationally, the governing Conservative Party fell 8 seats short of a parliamentary majority after the election, reduced to 4 if the absence of Sinn Féin is taken into account. The DUP thus held the balance of power, and announced on 10 June that it would support the Conservative government on a "confidence and supply" basis.

Results
Five seats changed hands in Northern Ireland. The SDLP lost its seats in Foyle and South Down to Sinn Féin and the constituency of Belfast South to the DUP. Meanwhile, the UUP lost South Antrim to the DUP and Fermanagh and South Tyrone to Sinn Féin. The number of unionist and nationalist representatives (11 and 7, respectively) remained unchanged from the 2015 general election, although none of the nationalist members are participating in the current Parliament.

Vote summary

References 

Northern Ireland
2017
2017 elections in Northern Ireland